The Works was an American digital broadcast television network owned by the MGM Television division of Metro-Goldwyn-Mayer. The network, which was primarily carried on the digital subchannels of television stations, maintained a general entertainment format featuring a mix of feature films, classic television sitcoms and drama series from the 1950s through the 1980s, and news and interview programming.

Through its ownership by MGM, The Works was a sister network to This TV, a joint venture between MGM and Tribune Broadcasting which also focuses on films and classic television series from the 1950s to the 1990s and carries programming from The Works' corporate cousin MGM Television.

History
With little prior announcement of its formation in advance of its debut, Metro-Goldwyn-Mayer launched The Works on April 1, 2014; the network debuted on nine television stations owned or operated by Titan Broadcast Management (though either NRJ TV or Ellis Communications), with an initial clearance rate of, at minimum, 31% of all television households in the United States. In addition to carrying The Works on its stations, Titan Broadcast Management also handles advertising sales for the network. To make room for the network, Titan ended its affiliations with the Retro Television Network on most of its stations, swapping out that network with The Works. The network was formally launched in January 2015, with 26 affiliate stations, covering 37% of the nation's television households.

The Works subchannel network quietly pulled off the air around February 28, 2017, when remaining affiliates, consisting mainly of Titan Broadcast Management operated stations, switched to Charge!, a Sinclair-owned subchannel network formerly operated by MGM.

Programming
The Works' program schedule relied primarily on the extensive library of films and television programming currently owned by MGM and subsidiary United Artists. Unlike many other digital multicast networks, The Works also featured some more recent and originally-produced programming.

The network maintained a general entertainment programming format with a large emphasis on theatrical feature films from the MGM library, sports and classic television series. News programming was also provided by the network through a programming agreement with The Huffington Post, which provided a rebroadcast of its discussion program Huff Post Live in separate two-hour blocks of news in the midday and early evening on Monday through Fridays; affiliates were also inclined to produce local news content to air on the network.

List of programs broadcast by The Works

Classic television series
 The Addams Family
 American Gladiators 
 Comedy Time 
 Home Run Derby 
 Science Fiction Theatre
 The Rat Patrol 
 Quick Laffs

Children's programming
 BoomerangE/I (imported from Australia)
 Johnny Sokko and His Flying Robot (imported from Japan)
 Heroes Among UsE/I
 Jack Hanna's Into the WildE/I
 Killer InstinctE/I
 Prince Planet (imported from Japan)

News/interview programming
 Huff Post Live

Former affiliates

Notes:
 1 NRJ TV is 33.3% owned by the principals of Titan Broadcasting Management, Bert Ellis and his partners.

References

External links
 

Defunct television networks in the United States
Metro-Goldwyn-Mayer
Television channels and stations established in 2014
Television channels and stations disestablished in 2017